Gerard I, Count of Guelders (c. 1060 – 8 March 1129) was Count of Guelders (Gelre in Dutch). He was the son of Theodoric of Wassenberg.

He may have been married to Clementia of Aquitaine, although that proposed marriage seems to be based on a falsified document. It is also possible that he married an unnamed daughter of William I, Count of Burgundy.
Gerard had three children:
 Jutta of Wassenberg, married Waleran II of Limburg.
 Yolande of Wassenberg (Yolande of Guelders), married 1) Baldwin III, Count of Hainaut and 2) Godfrey II de Ribemont Châtelain de Valenciennes
 Gerard II, Count of Guelders married Ermengarde of Zutphen, daughter of Otto II, Count of Zutphen.

References

1060s births
1129 deaths
Gerard I
House of Wassenberg
11th-century people of the Holy Roman Empire
12th-century people of the Holy Roman Empire